Harry Hill, Lord of the World (German:Harry Hill, der Herr der Welt) is a 1923 German silent film directed by Lorenz Bätz and starring Valy Arnheim. It was part of a series of films featuring Arnheim as the detective Harry Hill.

Cast
In alphabetical order
 Valy Arnheim 
 Rudolf Klein-Rhoden 
 Kurt Lilien 
 Marga Lindt 
 Aruth Wartan

References

Bibliography
 Gene Scott Freese. Hollywood Stunt Performers, 1910s-1970s: A Biographical Dictionary. McFarland, 2014.

External links

1923 films
Films of the Weimar Republic
Films directed by Lorenz Bätz
German silent feature films
German black-and-white films